Clarence Berton Roueché, Jr. (April 16, 1910 – April 28, 1994) was an American medical writer who wrote for The New Yorker magazine for almost fifty years. He also wrote twenty books, including Eleven Blue Men (1954), The Incurable Wound (1958), Feral (1974), and The Medical Detectives (1980). An article he wrote for The New Yorker was made into the 1956 film Bigger Than Life, and many of the medical mysteries on the television show House were inspired by Roueché's writings.

Biography
Berton Roueché was born in Chicago on April 16, 1910, to Clarence Berton Roueché Sr., a tailor, and Nana Maria Mossman His paternal great-grandparents emigrated from France. He graduated from Southwest High School in Kansas City in 1928 and is a member of the Southwest High School Hall of Fame. He received an undergraduate journalism degree at the University of Missouri in 1933. He was a reporter for The Kansas City Star, the St. Louis Post-Dispatch, and the St. Louis Globe-Democrat. On October 28, 1936, he married Katherine Eisenhower, the niece of future U.S. President General Dwight D. Eisenhower. She remained his wife until his death in 1994. They had one child, Arthur Bradford Roueché, who was born November 16, 1942.

In 1944, he was hired as a staff writer for The New Yorker magazine. In 1946, "The Annals of Medicine" department of the magazine was created for him. "The Annals of Medicine" is a series about medical detection and the fight against different diseases. An article he wrote for The New Yorker, titled "Ten Feet Tall", was made into a 1956 film called Bigger Than Life, which stars James Mason. The article and film are about the negative side effects of the drug cortisone. Roueché remained a staff writer for The New Yorker until his death, a span of about fifty years.

In addition to writing for The New Yorker, he also wrote twenty books. The books are mostly pieces of medical writing, focused on epidemiology, with elements of mystery and detective work. He also wrote several suspense novels, these include Black Weather (1945), The Last Enemy (1956), Feral (1974), and Fago (1977). Roueché's writings, especially his book The Medical Detectives (1980), inspired in part the television show House, which premiered in 2004 on the Fox network. Many of the medical cases in the show are directly inspired by real-life cases in The Medical Detectives. His 1954 book Eleven Blue Men, which was a collection of pieces he had written for The New Yorker, was awarded a Raven by the Mystery Writers of America. In 1982, he received an Academy Award of The American Academy of Arts and Letters for literature. He also received awards from the American Medical Association, the New England Journal of Medicine, the Kansas City Academy of Medicine, the American Medical Writers Association, and the Lasker Foundation.

On April 28, 1994, Roueché died at his home in Amagansett, Long Island. He was 84 years old. He committed suicide by a shotgun wound to his head. He had been diagnosed with emphysema five years earlier, and his wife said he had been depressed.

Works
 Author
Black Weather (1945) (also known as Rooming House)
Greener Grass (1948)
Phone Call
The Delectable Mountains (1953)
Eleven Blue Men, and Other Narratives of Medical Detection (1954)
Annals of Medical Detection (Eleven Blue Men – Alternative Title) (1954)
The Last Enemy (1956)
The Incurable Wound and Further Narratives of Medical Detection (1958)
The Neutral Spirit: a Portrait of Alcohol (1960)
A Man Named Hoffman and Other Narratives of Medical Detection (1966)
Annals of Epidemiology (1967)
What's Left (1968)
The Orange Man and Other Narratives of Medical Detection (1971)
Feral (1974) (also released as The Cats)
Desert and plain, the mountains and the river: A celebration of rural America (1975)
Fago (1977)
The River World and Other Explorations (1978)
The Medical Detectives (1980)
Special Places: In Search of Small Town America (1982)
The Medical Detectives II (1984)
Sea to Shining Sea: People, Travels, Places (1987)
The Man Who Grew Two Breasts: And Other True Tales of Medical Detection (1996) (published posthumously; the book contains seven installments from The New Yorker feature, "The Annals of Medicine", that had not been in any books previously)

Editor
Curiosities of Medicine: An assembly of medical diversions, 1552–1962 (1963)
Handbook for World Travelers: Field Guide to Disease (1967)

References

External links
 (note the alternate spelling of his first name and the incorrect birth and death dates) (note the incorrect spelling of his last name)

1910 births
1994 suicides
Writers from Kansas City, Missouri
20th-century American novelists
American male journalists
20th-century American journalists
American medical writers
American male novelists
The New Yorker staff writers
The New Yorker people
St. Louis Globe-Democrat people
St. Louis Post-Dispatch people
People from Amagansett, New York
Missouri School of Journalism alumni
Deaths by firearm in New York (state)
20th-century American male writers
Novelists from Missouri
Writers from Chicago
American people of French descent